PACA or Paca may refer to: 

 Paca, either of two large rodent species
 Paca, a shortening of the Spanish name Francisca
 Perishable Agricultural Commodities Act of 1930 (US)

People
 William Paca, signer of the U.S. Declaration of Independence
 Paca Blanco, Spanish environmentalist
 Paca Navas, Honduran journalist
 Paca Thomas, US entertainment media producer

Places
 Pača, a village in Slovakia
 Paca, Tibet, a village
 Paca District, Jauja, Peru
 Paca (mountain), Peru
 La Paca, Murcia, Spain, a village
 Lake Paca, Peru
 Provence-Alpes-Côte d'Azur, a region of France

Schools
 Pan American Christian Academy, São Paulo, Brazil
 Portslade Aldridge Community Academy, England

See also
 Paka (disambiguation)